Amarinthe may refer to:

Amarinthe, character from The Princess (W. S. Gilbert play)
"Amarinthe", song by Billy Corgan from Ogilala

See also
Amaranthe